Sergio Ortega González (born 25 November 1980 in Torrelavega, Cantabria) is a Spanish retired footballer who played as a central defender.

References

External links

Celta de Vigo biography 

1980 births
Living people
People from Torrelavega
Spanish footballers
Footballers from Cantabria
Association football defenders
La Liga players
Segunda División players
Segunda División B players
Tercera División players
Gimnástica de Torrelavega footballers
Rayo Cantabria players
CD Numancia players
RC Celta de Vigo players